Nevio Scala (born 22 November 1947) is an Italian football sporting director, coach and former player.

Throughout his footballing career, he played as a midfielder for several Italian clubs, and won several titles during his time with A.C. Milan. As a manager, he is mostly known for his role as head coach of Parma during the club's golden age of the 1990s, which saw him lead the team from Serie B to several European triumphs.

Playing career
Born in Lozzo Atestino, Province of Padua, Veneto, Scala enjoyed a successful career as a midfielder for several Italian top-flight teams — Roma, Milan, Vicenza and Internazionale — and subsequently played for lower-ranked clubs Foggia, Monza and Adriese in the final years of his career.
As a player, with A.C. Milan, he won 1 Italian Championship (1967–68), 1 European Champions Cup (1968–69), and 1 European Cup Winners' Cup (1967–68).

Coaching career
As a coach, he led Calabrian third division club Reggina to Serie B in 1988, and then moved to Serie B club Parma. He held that position for six years, leading the Emilian club to its first promotion to the Italian top flight in 1990, and subsequently turned the team into one of the major clubs in the Italian Serie A, thanks also to the relevant financial backing from chairman and Parmalat founder Calisto Tanzi, winning several domestic and European titles. During his time at Parma, Scala won the Coppa Italia in 1992, the Cup Winners' Cup and the European Super Cup in 1993, and the UEFA Cup in 1995. He also managed runners-up medals in the Coppa Italia in 1995, in the Cup Winners' Cup in 1994, and twice in the Supercoppa Italiana in 1992 and 1995, while his best result in the league was a third-place finish during the 1994–95 Serie A season. He left Parma in June 1996.

During the 1996–97 season, Scala accepted an offer from Luciano Gaucci to become head coach of struggling Perugia, but did not manage to escape relegation to Serie B for his side.

He successively pursued a number of experiences abroad, becoming head coach of German club Borussia Dortmund in 1997, with whom he won the Intercontinental Cup. He left the club in 1998. In 2000, he became another Italian coach after Giuseppe Meazza and Sandro Puppo to manage a Turkish team by accepting an offer from Beşiktaş, and then went on to serve as head coach for Ukraine's FC Shakhtar Donetsk where he won Ukraine Champion and Cup 2002 and Russians Spartak Moscow winning the Russian Cup 2003, the latter being his last head coaching experiences to date.

He currently lives in his hometown city of Lozzo Atestino, where he is member of the local city council since 2007, after running unsuccessfully as mayor in 2007. He is currently active as a football pundit for Rai Radio 1, where he regularly comments Serie A games and gives his answers to live phone comments and questions on Sunday late night show Domenica sport.

In the early 2010s, Scala expressed a desire to return to coaching, being linked with Motherwell F.C. and later with A.S. Roma in 2010.

In July 2015, he was confirmed as new chairman of a refounded Parma, after the original club folded due to financial issues, while former player Luigi Apolloni was chosen as head coach. Parma managed to return to the professional Italian leagues that season, and clinched promotion from Serie D into Lega Pro on 17 April 2016. Scala resigned from chairmanship in November 2016, in disagreement with the club owners' decision to sack head coach Luigi Apolloni and technical director Lorenzo Minotti, both former players of his during his days as Parma manager.

Honours

Player
Milan
Serie A: 1967–68
European Cup: 1968–69
European Cup Winners' Cup: 1967–68

Managerial
Parma
Coppa Italia: 1991–92; runner-up 1994–95
European Cup Winners' Cup: 1992–93; runner-up 1993–94
European Super Cup: 1993
UEFA Cup: 1994–95
Supercoppa Italiana: runner-up 1992, 1995

Borussia Dortmund
Intercontinental Cup: 1997

Shakhtar Donetsk
Ukrainian Premier League: 2001–02
Ukrainian Cup: 2001–02

Spartak Moscow
Russian Super Cup: runner-up 2004

See also
 List of UEFA Cup Winners' Cup winning managers
 List of UEFA Cup and Europa League winning managers

References

1947 births
Living people
Sportspeople from the Province of Padua
Association football midfielders
Calcio Foggia 1920 players
Inter Milan players
A.C. Milan players
A.C. Monza players
A.S. Roma players
L.R. Vicenza players
Serie A players
Italian football managers
Parma Calcio 1913 managers
A.C. Perugia Calcio managers
Serie A managers
Borussia Dortmund managers
Beşiktaş J.K. managers
FC Shakhtar Donetsk managers
FC Spartak Moscow managers
Italian expatriate football managers
Russian Premier League managers
Expatriate football managers in Russia
Süper Lig managers
Expatriate football managers in Turkey
UEFA Cup winning managers
Bundesliga managers
Expatriate football managers in Germany
Ukrainian Premier League managers
Expatriate football managers in Ukraine
Italian expatriate sportspeople in Ukraine
Parma Calcio 1913 chairmen and investors
Italian football chairmen and investors
Italian footballers
Footballers from Veneto